Emitt Rhodes is the second album by Emitt Rhodes, released in 1970, although it is generally considered to be his debut album, as The American Dream was a contractual obligation, released without Rhodes' input.

Rhodes recorded the album in his home studio. At the time, union rules required that recordings released on major labels must be recorded in proper studios, so the fact that this was a home recording could not be mentioned on the cover. The runout groove of the original LP release on Dunhill Records contained a decorative banner proclaiming, "Recorded at Home." Rhodes wanted to call the album Homecooking, but Dunhill decided to title it Emitt Rhodes.

Rhodes recorded the instruments on a four-track recorder and then approached Dunhill, who gave him a contract. He transferred the four-track instrumental recordings to an eight-track recorder to add the vocals on the four additional channels (and using a better microphone).

The album reached number 29 on the Billboard album chart. The single "Fresh as a Daisy" reached number 54 on the Hot 100. Billboard later called the album one of the "best albums of the decade".

The song "Lullabye" was featured in the film The Royal Tenenbaums.

Alt-country singer Tift Merritt recorded a cover of "Live Till You Die" on her 2010 album See You on the Moon.

Track listing
All tracks written by Emitt Rhodes.

Personnel 
Emitt Rhodes - all instruments and voices
Keith Olsen - mixdown engineer
Curt Boettcher - mixdown engineer

References
 Emitt Rhodes: Recorded at Home, by Kevin Ryan, Tape Op #33, Jan. 2003, pp 44–50.
 Emitt Rhodes Song Book, published by Thirty Four Music Co., 1971

Emitt Rhodes albums
1970 albums
Dunhill Records albums
Albums produced by Emitt Rhodes
Albums recorded in a home studio